Janis Spindel is a matchmaker, author,  entrepreneur, and creator of Janis Spindel Serious Matchmaking, Inc. in 1993. According to her website, she created the matchmaking service after matching fourteen couples who married within one year. Her company is headquartered in New York City on the Upper East Side and, in the summer months, in the Hamptons. Although she is located in New York, she travels the US and Canada for her clients. Her website was launched in 2005. She originally worked with both men and women, but now only works with men. She specializes in upscale professionals, ages  27-78.

Spindel is a former fashion executive. Prior to matchmaking, she was the proprietor of nine retail locations of "Mommy and Me".

Spindel is involved with charities including The Libby Ross Foundation, Susan G. Komen Foundation, City Meals On Wheels, and St. Judes Hospital.

Books 
Her first book, Get Serious About Getting Married: 365 Proven Ways to Find Love in Less Than a Year was published by Harper Collins/Regan Books in January 2006.  The book hit the New York Times Best Seller list upon its release.  

Her second book,  “How to Date Men: Dating Secrets from Americas Top Matchmaker”  was released in August 2007. It was published by Plume/U.S. Penguin Group, and also hit the New York Times Best Seller list.  An article in New York Times addressed the issues that the book touches upon.  “Ms. Spindel’s guide addresses typical benchmarks like the first and second date, a relationship’s failure to thrive and adjustment issues…”

References

External links
 Janis Spindel's website
 "60 minutes, Meet Janis Spindel", Yahoo News, September 16, 2008 

Living people
American women writers
American marketing people
Marketing women
Year of birth missing (living people)
21st-century American women